Events from the year 1789 in Scotland.

Incumbents

Law officers 
 Lord Advocate – Ilay Campbell; then Robert Dundas of Arniston
 Solicitor General for Scotland – Robert Dundas of Arniston; then Robert Blair

Judiciary 
 Lord President of the Court of Session – Lord Glenlee until 27 September; then from 26 October Lord Succoth
 Lord Justice General – The Viscount Stormont
 Lord Justice Clerk – Lord Braxfield

Events 
 10 July – Scottish explorer Alexander Mackenzie reaches the Mackenzie River delta in North America.
 November – foundation stone for Old College, University of Edinburgh, laid.
 December – steamboat experiments on the Forth and Clyde Canal by Patrick Miller of Dalswinton. 
 The original lighthouses at Eilean Glas on Scalpay, Outer Hebrides, and Dennis Head Old Beacon on North Ronaldsay, Orkney, are completed by Thomas Smith.
 Robert Adam designs a new house at Newliston.
 Andrew Duncan delivers the first lectures on forensic medicine in Britain, at the University of Edinburgh.
 The Aberdeen Medico-Chirurgical Society is founded by James McGrigor and James Robertson.
 Robert Burns is appointed an exciseman.
 New pump room for St Bernard's Well, Stockbridge, Edinburgh, designed by painter Alexander Nasmyth.
 John Ainslie completes and publishes his 9-sheet map of Scotland.
 Flax mill established at Old Deer.
 Clyde Model Dockyard is established as a toyshop in Glasgow.

Births 
 5 January – Thomas Pringle, writer, poet and abolitionist (died 1834)
 28 February – David Duncan, Presbyterian minister (died 1829)
 1 March – John Ramsay McCulloch, economist (died 1864 in London)
 17 August – William Knox, poet and journalist (died 1825)
 12 October – William Collins, publisher (died 1853)
 30 October – Michael Scott, author (died 1835)
 9 November – Robert Pearse Gillies, poet and writer (died 1858 in London)
 November – Peter Miller Cunningham, naval surgeon and pioneer in Australia (died 1864 in Greenwich)
 3 December – Archibald Robertson, physician (died 1864 in Bristol)
 20 December – William Burn, architect, pioneer of the Scottish Baronial style (died 1870)
 23 December – George Douglas, 17th Earl of Morton, Tory politician (died 1858)
 Thomas Wright, prison visitor (died 1875 in Manchester)

Deaths 
 17 March – Sir Charles Douglas, 1st Baronet, admiral (born 1727)
 27 September – Thomas Miller, Lord Glenlee, judge and politician (born 1717)

Sport 
 9 October – the first recorded cricket century to be scored in Scotland is made by the Hon. Colonel Charles Lennox: he scores 136 not out.

References 

 
Years of the 18th century in Scotland
Scotland
1780s in Scotland